Group 4 of the 1950 FIFA World Cup took place on 2 July 1950. The group consisted of Uruguay, France, and Bolivia. However, France later withdrew from the group. The group winners advanced to the final round.

Standings

Matches
All times listed are local time.

Uruguay vs Bolivia

References

External links
 1950 FIFA World Cup archive

1950 FIFA World Cup
Uruguay at the 1950 FIFA World Cup
Bolivia at the 1950 FIFA World Cup